Pieter Vanspeybrouck (born 10 February 1987 in Tielt) is a Belgian former professional road bicycle racer, who now works as a directeur sportif for UCI WorldTeam .

In June 2017, he was named in the startlist for the Tour de France.

Major results
Source: 

2006
 3rd Road race, National Under-23 Road Championships
 3rd Paris–Roubaix Espoirs
2007
 3rd Kattekoers
 3rd Circuit de Wallonie
 5th De Vlaamse Pijl
 10th Ronde van Vlaanderen Beloften
 10th Vlaamse Havenpijl
2008
 3rd De Vlaamse Pijl
2009
 9th GP Triberg-Schwarzwald
 10th Sparkassen Giro Bochum
2010
 6th Dutch Food Valley Classic
 7th Ronde van het Groene Hart
2011
 1st Sparkassen Giro Bochum
 5th Road race, National Road Championships
 6th Halle–Ingooigem
2012
 7th Nokere Koerse
2013
 4th Grote Prijs Stad Zottegem
 7th Châteauroux Classic
 10th Grand Prix d'Ouverture La Marseillaise
2014
 5th De Kustpijl
2015
 10th Halle–Ingooigem
2016
 1st Omloop Mandel-Leie-Schelde
 4th Eschborn–Frankfurt – Rund um den Finanzplatz
 6th Overall Tour de Luxembourg
 6th Dorpenomloop Rucphen
 6th Classic Loire Atlantique
 6th Brussels Cycling Classic
 7th Overall Tour of Belgium
 7th Cholet-Pays de Loire
 9th Rund um Köln
2018
 10th Vuelta a Murcia
 10th Grand Prix Criquielion
2019
 10th Clásica de Almería

Grand Tour general classification results timeline

References

External links

Belgian male cyclists
1987 births
Living people
Cyclists from West Flanders
People from Tielt